Carruth is a surname of Scottish origin. Notable people with the surname include: 

Arthur J. Carruth Jr. (1887–1962), American newspaperman
Buffie Carruth (b. 1977), American model, fitness instructor, actress and writer
Hayden Carruth (1921–2008), American poet and literary critic
Jimmy Carruth (b. 1969), American basketball player
Michael Carruth (b. 1967), Irish boxer
Nathan Carruth (1808–1881), American railroad pioneer
Rae Carruth (b. 1974), American football player
Shane Carruth (b. 1972), American film actor and producer
William Herbert Carruth (1859–1924), American author and poet